Podlesovo is a rural locality (a village) in Yenangskoye Rural Settlement, Kichmengsko-Gorodetsky District, Vologda Oblast, Russia. The population was 14 as of 2002.

Geography 
Podlesovo is located 83 km southeast of Kichmengsky Gorodok (the district's administrative centre) by road. Sementsev Dor is the nearest rural locality.

References 

Rural localities in Kichmengsko-Gorodetsky District